The Yalu River is a river straddling the Chinese regions of Heilongjiang and Hulunbuir near the eastern border with Russia. As a right tributary of the Nen River, the Yalu starts on the eastern slopes of the Greater Khingan Range, and flows in the general south-eastern direction through Zalantun in Hulunbei'er and Qiqihar in Heilongjiang.

As the Nen then flows to the south and into the Songhua River, and the Songhua, to the east and northeast and into the Heilongjiang River, the Yalu River is part of the Heilongjiang River basin.

Rivers of Inner Mongolia
Rivers of Heilongjiang
Songhua River